Born as Fred Valles on 4 May 1886 in London, this Hollywood costume designer took the name Arlington Valles as his professional handle, eventually jettisoning the "Arlington" part completely. 
He first provided costumes for the 1938 version of A Christmas Carol. He did noticeably good work on National Velvet (1944), Albert Lewin's The Picture of Dorian Gray (1945), The Yearling (1946) and That Forsyte Woman (1949, for which he received an Academy Award nomination).

In 1960, his efforts on his last film, Spartacus, won him an Academy Award for Best Costume Design, Color, shared with Bill Thomas.

Valles died on 12 April 1970 in Los Angeles, California, aged 83.

American costume designers
1886 births
1970 deaths
British emigrants to the United States
Best Costume Design Academy Award winners
Burials at Forest Lawn Memorial Park (Glendale)